In differential topology, a branch of mathematics, a Mazur manifold is a contractible, compact, smooth four-dimensional manifold (with boundary) which is not diffeomorphic to the standard 4-ball.  The boundary of a Mazur manifold is necessarily a homology 3-sphere.

Frequently the term Mazur manifold is restricted to a special class of the above definition: 4-manifolds that have a handle decomposition containing exactly three handles: a single 0-handle, a single 1-handle and single 2-handle. This is equivalent to saying the manifold must be of the form  union a 2-handle.

History 
Barry Mazur and Valentin Poenaru discovered these manifolds simultaneously. These results were later generalized to other contractible manifolds by Casson, Harer and Stern. One of the Mazur manifolds is also an example of an Akbulut cork which can be used to construct exotic 4-manifolds.

Mazur manifolds have been used by Fintushel and Stern to construct exotic actions of a group of order 2 on the 4-sphere.

Mazur's discovery was surprising for several reasons:

 Every smooth homology sphere in dimension  is homeomorphic to the boundary of a compact contractible smooth manifold. This follows from the work of Kervaire and the h-cobordism theorem.  Slightly more strongly, every smooth homology 4-sphere is diffeomorphic to the boundary of a compact contractible smooth 5-manifold (also by the work of Kervaire). But not every homology 3-sphere is diffeomorphic to the boundary of a contractible compact smooth 4-manifold. For example, the Poincaré homology sphere does not bound such a 4-manifold because the Rochlin invariant provides an obstruction.

 The h-cobordism Theorem implies that, at least in dimensions  there is a unique contractible -manifold with simply-connected boundary, where uniqueness is up to diffeomorphism. This manifold is the unit ball . Whether or not  admits an exotic smooth structure is equivalent to another open problem, the smooth Poincaré conjecture in dimension four. Whether or not  admits an exotic smooth structure is another open problem, closely linked to the Schoenflies problem in dimension four.

Mazur's observation 
Let  be a Mazur manifold that is constructed as  union a 2-handle. The 2-handle can be unknotted since the attaching map is a framed knot in the 4-manifold .

References 

Differential topology
Manifolds